"Some Fools Never Learn" is a song written by John Scott Sherrill and recorded by American country music artist Steve Wariner.  It was released in July 1985 as the third single from the album One Good Night Deserves Another.  The song was Wariner's second number one on the country chart. The single went to number one for one week and spent a total of twenty-two weeks on the chart.

Sherrill originally recorded the song in 1982 for Portrait Records.

Charts

Weekly charts

Year-end charts

References
 

1985 singles
1984 songs
Steve Wariner songs
Songs written by John Scott Sherrill
Song recordings produced by Jimmy Bowen
Song recordings produced by Tony Brown (record producer)
MCA Records singles